Cusago is a comune (municipality) in the Metropolitan City of Milan in the Italian region Lombardy, located about  west of Milan.

Cusago borders the following municipalities: Milan, Cornaredo, Settimo Milanese, Bareggio, Cisliano, Trezzano sul Naviglio, Gaggiano.

References

External links
 Official website

Cities and towns in Lombardy